The  is a commuter electric multiple unit (EMU) train type owned by the third-sector railway company Chiba New Town Railway and operated by the Hokuso Railway on the Hokuso Line in Japan since 21 March 2017. The sole eight-car trainset, 9808, was converted and renumbered from former Keisei 3700 series EMU set 3738 to replace the former Chiba New Town Railway 9000 series EMU withdrawn following its last day in service on 20 March 2017.

Formation
, the fleet consists of a single eight-car set formed as shown below, with six motored (M) cars and two trailer (T) cars, and car 1 at the southern end.

The two M1 cars each have two single-arm pantographs, and the M1' car has one.

See also
 Hokuso 7300 series, a similar type owned by Hokuso Railway

References

External links

 Hokuso Railway rolling stock details 

Electric multiple units of Japan
Train-related introductions in 2017

ja:北総開発鉄道7300形電車#千葉ニュータウン鉄道9800形
1500 V DC multiple units of Japan